Neal's Yard Dairy is a London artisanal cheese retailer, wholesaler and (formerly) cheesemaker in London, which was founded in 1979. It has been described as "London's foremost cheese store."

History 
Neal's Yard Dairy was founded in 1979 by Nicholas Saunders and Randolph Hodgson as a cheesemaker's shop. The original store, located in Neal's Yard, Covent Garden, London, is considered an important part of the revival of the immediate area. The shop moved around the corner to 17 Shorts Gardens in 1992.

One of the first customers was Monty Python's John Cleese. The new owners were still learning how to make cheese, and "had only managed yoghurt that day, so it all rather descended into a Monty Python sketch". Despite this rocky start, the store grew from a cheesemaker into a retailer of artisanal, mostly British and Irish cheeses (including farmhouse Cheddar cheese and varieties such as Stinking Bishop), spinning off the cheesemaking operation as Neal's Yard Creamery in 1985.

A cheese store was opened in Borough Market in 1997, which opened as a second shop in 1998. By 2010 the cheese store was moved to railway arches in Druid Street, Bermondsey. Together with Monmouth Coffee Company and a property company, Neal's Yard Dairy took a lease on a stretch of railway arches around Spa Road railway station in Bermondsey to provide accommodation for food manufacturers and wholesalers. The company headquarters moved into railway arches at Spa Terminus in 2018. In 2020 the company opened a fourth shop in Islington.

As of 2020, the company sells about 550 tonnes of cheese a year through its shops, exports and online.

References

External links

 
 Photo Story about Neal's Yard Dairy cheese shop

Shops in London
Buildings and structures in the London Borough of Camden
Buildings and structures in the London Borough of Southwark
Dairy products companies of the United Kingdom
Tourist attractions in the London Borough of Camden
Tourist attractions in the London Borough of Southwark
British companies established in 1979
Food and drink companies established in 1979